Saptha is a genus of moths in the family Choreutidae.

Species
Saptha aeolodoxa (Meyrick, 1928)
Saptha angustistriata (Issiki, 1930)
Saptha beryllitis (Meyrick, 1910)
Saptha chrysoprasitis (Meyrick, 1936)
Saptha cypridia (Meyrick, 1910)
Saptha divitiosa Walker, 1864
Saptha elegans Walsingham, 1900
Saptha exanthista (Meyrick, 1910)
Saptha iridopa (Meyrick, 1907)
Saptha libanota (Meyrick, 1910)
Saptha macrospila (Diakonoff, 1968)
Saptha paradelpha (Meyrick, 1907)
Saptha prasochalca (Meyrick, 1907)
Saptha pretiosa (Walker, 1866)
Saptha pronubana (Snellen, 1877)
Saptha smaragditis Meyrick, 1905
Saptha tabularia (Meyrick, 1912)

External links
choreutidae.lifedesks.org
Saptha at funet

Choreutidae